Robert Llewellyn Sumwalt (July 8, 1895 – January 24, 1977) was an American engineer and academic.

Sumwalt was born in Baltimore on July 8, 1895. He began undergraduate studies at Delaware College in 1914, belonged to the Sigma Nu fraternity there, and received a B.S. degree in 1918, for which his thesis was "The Design of A Type Emergency Mill Building".

Background
In 1919, he was serving in the Engineers Corps. He received from University of Delaware (the successor to the college) a professional degree for which he wrote a 1921 thesis on the construction of a mental hospital.

Pierre S. du Pont, who was a patron of the university, had in 1918 begun a correspondence with Sumwalt (which continued for decades, into the year of Du Pont's death), and assisted Sumwalt financially while he was earning his S.B.C.E. at M.I.T.

Sumwalt married Caroline Causey by 1927, and his son, Robert Llewellyn Sumwalt Jr, was born the next year.

Sumwalt joined the faculty of the  University of South Carolina as assistant professor in 1926, becoming full professor in 1931 and dean of the School of Engineering in 1943. He became the university's acting president in 1957, then president in 1959 and continuing to 1962.

After 36 years working at the university, he retired and was employed on the professional staff of the Senate Post Office and Civil Service Committee.

UofSC has established chairs in mathematics and chemistry bearing his name and named a building within the college of engineering in his honor. Sumwalt died on January 24, 1977.

References

1895 births
1977 deaths
People from Baltimore
20th-century American engineers
Presidents of the University of South Carolina
University of South Carolina faculty
University of Delaware alumni
20th-century American academics